Chopra is a census town in Chopra CD Block in Islampur subdivision of Uttar Dinajpur district in the state of West Bengal, India.

Geography

Location

In the map alongside, all places marked on the map are linked in the full screen version.

Police station
Chopra police station under West Bengal police has jurisdiction over Chopra CD Block. It is 145 km from the district headquarters and covers an area of 378.40 km2.

CD block HQ
The headquarters of Chopra CD block is at Chopra.

Demographics
As per the 2011 Census of India, Chopra had a total population of 5,777, of which 2,997 (52%) were males and 2,780 (48%) were females. The population below 6 years was 841. The total number of literates in Chopra was 3,388 (68.64% of the population over 6 years).

Transport
National Highway 27 passes through Chopra.

Education
Chopra Kamala Paul Smriti Mahavidyalaya was established in 2013-14 at Chopra. Affiliated to the North Bengal University, it offers honours courses in Bengali, history and political science. Urdu is taught as a general subject.

Chopra High School is a Bengali-medium coeducational higher secondary school established in 1968. Housed in a government building it has facilities for teaching from class VI to XII. It has 18 computers, a library and a playground.

Chopra Girls High School is Bengali-medium girls only higher secondary school established in 1979. Housed in a government building it has facilities for teaching from class VI to XII. It has 11 computers, a library and a playground.

Healthcare
Dalua rural hospital at Dalua (with 30 beds), the main medical facility in Chopra CD block, is located nearby.

References

Cities and towns in Uttar Dinajpur district